Stephan Bittner is a former West German-German slalom canoeist who competed in the 1980s and 1990s. He won three bronze medals in the C-2 team event at the ICF Canoe Slalom World Championships. Two of them for West Germany (1987, 1989) and the last one for Germany in 1991.

References
Overview of athlete's results at canoeslalom.net 

German male canoeists
Living people
Year of birth missing (living people)
Medalists at the ICF Canoe Slalom World Championships